This list is of the Historic Sites of Japan located within the Prefecture of Aomori.

National Historic Sites
As of 17 December 2021, twenty-three Sites have been designated as being of national significance (including one *Special Historic Site).

| align="center"|Sannohe Castle SiteSannohe-jō ato || Sannohe || ||  ||  || 2 || 
|-
|}

Prefectural Historic Sites
As of 11 October 2021, a further twenty Sites have been designated as being of prefectural importance.

Municipal Historic Sites
As of 1 May 2021, a further ninety-two Sites have been designated as being of municipal importance.

See also

 Cultural Properties of Japan
 Mutsu Province
 List of Places of Scenic Beauty of Japan (Aomori)
 List of Cultural Properties of Japan - paintings (Aomori)
 Aomori Prefectural Museum

References

External links
  Cultural Properties of Aomori Prefecture

Aomori Prefecture
 Aomori